Orhan Veli Kanık or Orhan Veli (14 April 1914 – 14 November 1950) was a Turkish poet. Kanık is one of the founders of the Garip Movement together with Oktay Rıfat and Melih Cevdet. Aiming to fundamentally transform traditional form in Turkish poetry, he introduced colloquialisms into the poetic language. Besides his poetry Kanık crammed an impressive volume of works including essays, articles and translations into 36 short years.

Orhan Veli shunned everything old in order to be able to bring about a new 'taste', refusing to use syllable and aruz meters. He professed to regarding the rhyme primitive, literary rhetoric techniques such as metaphor, simile, hyperbole unnecessary. Set out "to do away with all tradition, everything that bygone literatures taught", although this desire of Kanık limits the technical possibilities in his poetry, the poet broke new grounds for himself with the themes and personalities he covered and the vocabulary he employed. He brought the poetic language closer to the spoken language by adopting a plain phraseology. 
In 1941 his poems embodying these ideas were published in a poetry volume named Garip, released jointly with his friends Oktay Rıfat and Melih Cevdet, which led to the emergence of the Garip movement. This movement had a huge influence especially between the years 1945-1950 on Republican era Turkish verse. The Garip poetry is accepted as a touchstone in Turkish verse for its both destructive and constructive effects.

At first Kanık mostly was found peculiar, he was criticized harshly, and heaped upon much opprobrium because of the innovations he introduced to poetry. Although Orhan Veli's tradition-transgressing works were first received with bemusement and dismay, and were subject to derision and contempt later, they have always aroused interest. This interest however, eventually led to an increase in understanding of, and affection and admiration for the poet. Sait Faik Abasıyanık called attention to this aspect of Orhan Veli's public standing identifying him as "a poet who was much scrutinized, at times mocked, at times embraced, then again rejected, to be once again acclaimed; who achieved both great fame and notoriety in his time".

Although he stands out with his Garip period poems, Orhan Veli had eschewed writing poetry of a "single type". Kanık had been renewing himself and searching without cease throughout his career in literature, a long adventure of poetry in a short life, that consists of different stages. Oktay Rıfat has explained this by saying: "Orhan lived in his very short lifetime an adventure in poetry equal to a few generations of French poets. Turkish poetry became head to head with European poetry thanks to his pen.", and "A transformation which several generations back to back could maybe achieve, he completed in a few years."

Life

Childhood and education 
Orhan Veli Kanık was born at number 9 Çayır Alley on the İshak Ağa Climb in Yalıköy Beykoz, on 14 April 1914. His father, Mehmet Veli, was the son of Fehmi Bey, a merchant from İzmir, while his mother was Fatma Nigar, Hacı Ahmet Bey's daughter from Beykoz. According to the population registry, his birth name is Ahmet Orhan, but he came to be known as Orhan Veli after his father before a Surname Law was enacted in Turkey. His father, Veli Kanık was a clarinetist in the Imperial Military Band at the time of his marriage. He became a conductor when the band moved to Ankara to become the Presidential Symphony Orchestra after the declaration of Republic in Turkey. Because of this new position, as well as that of a professor of harmony in Music Teachers' School (later Ankara State Conservatory) he lived in Ankara between the years 1923–1948. Veli Bey also served for a while as a director at Ankara Radio during this period. Later on he moved to Istanbul Conservatory to serve as a member of its scientific board, and he also worked as an audio specialist in İstanbul Radio. Orhan Veli had two younger siblings: journalist Adnan Veli Kanık of Vatan Newspaper and Füruzan Yolyapan. It appears the poet also had a baby sister named Ayşe Zerrin who died in Ankara at the age of one.
 
Orhan Veli spent his childhood years in Beykoz, Beşiktaş and Cihangir. He started at the kindergarten class of Anafartalar Elementary School in Akaretler during the days of Armistice. After a year however, he was enrolled as a boarding student in Galatasaray High School. He was circumcised at a mass ceremony organized by Caliph Abdülmecit in the Yıldız Palace when was seven. In 1925 after completing fourth grade he left Galatasaray High School to move with his mother to Ankara on his father's wish. There he was enrolled in the Gazi Elementary School. After a year he moved to Ankara High School for Boys as a boarder. Kanık suffered several health problems in his childhood. At five he was badly burnt and had to receive treatment for a prolonged period. He contracted measles at nine, and scarlet fever when he was seventeen years old.

Kanık's interest in literature began in elementary school years. A story of his was published in the magazine "Çocuk Dünyası" (Child's World) at this time. He met his lifelong friend Oktay Rıfat Horozcu in seventh grade. He would make friends with Melih Cevdet Anday a few years later, at a student show in a Community Center. In Kanık's first year of high school Ahmet Hamdi Tanpınar was his teacher and an early mentor providing advice and guidance. The poet published a magazine named "Sesimiz" (Our Voice) with his friends Oktay Rıfat and Melih Cevdet during his high school years. This stage in the artist's life was when he learned and gained an appreciation of the rules and harmony of the traditional aruz meter, and wrote his first poems.

He also exhibited an interest in theater while in high school. He had parts in several public performances, in the play "Aktör Kin" starring Raşit Rıza, as "Üstad-ı Sanî" in Ahmet Vefik Paşa's Moliere adaptation "Zor Nikâh" (Le Mariage forcé) staged by Ercüment Behzat Lav in the Ankara Community Center, and as the "father" in Maurice Maeterlinck's "Monna Vanna". Kanık would keep up his involvement in theater in later years as a translator, translating many plays into Turkish.

The poet graduated from high school in 1932. He was enrolled in the philosophy chair of Istanbul University's Department of Literature. In 1933 he was elected the president of the Department of Literature Students' Association. He dropped out of the university in 1935 without obtaining his degree. He continued with his teacher's assistant position at the Galatasaray High School for another year after dropping out of college.

Later life and literary career 
Kanık moved to Ankara and was hired at Telegraph Department International Orders Bureau of the PTT, the Turkish national mail and telegraph service. He got together with his old friend Oktay Rıfat and Melih Cevdet, and the trio began writing poetry in a similar style. In 1936 Orhan Veli's poems "Oaristys", "Ebabil", "Eldorado", "Düşüncelerimin Başucunda" were published in the "Varlık" magazine upon Nahid Sırrı Örik's suggestion. In the magazine Orhan Veli and his friends were introduced with these words: "Varlık is boosting its cadre of poets with new and powerful young pens. Orhan Veli, whose four poems you may read below, manifests a mature art even though he has never been published before. In our future issues he will bespeak better the new breath he and his friends Oktay Rıfat, Melih Cedet and Mehmet Ali Sel are bringing to our poetry."

These first poems were followed by others, some of which were published under the alias Mehmet Ali Sel. Between 1936 and 1942 his poetry and essays were published in the magazines "İnsan", "Ses", "Gençlik", "Küllük", "İnkılâpçı Gençlik" as well as Varlık. Because of the form, structure and content of his works from the early days of this period, he was seen as a syllabic verse poet. After 1937 however, Kanık, like Horozcu and Anday, began publishing new style poems.

In 1939 Orhan Veli was in a car accident with his friend Melih Cevdet, as a result of which he was in a coma for twenty days. Melih Cevdet was driving the car they were in when it rolled off the top of Çubuk Dam. In May 1942 the Garip collection was published. This volume included 24 poems from Orhan Veli, along with 16 by Melih Cevdet and 20 by Oktay Rıfat. Orhan Veli had also penned the sensational introduction of the volume. Garip marks the beginning of the Garip movement, also known as the "Birinci Yeni" (the First New). Kanık, Horozcu and Anday were adopting a radical stance rejecting both the syllabist tradition and Ahmet Haşim's poetry that preceded them, and Nazım Hikmet's social-realist verse. The poetry and the introduction of the Garip volume caused controversy in the Turkish literary world. A specific line by Orhan Veli became a focus of dispute: "Yazık oldu Süleyman Efendi'ye". Some denounced it, and there were also some charges of plagiarism, yet on the other hand a number of critics found it to be one of the most eloquently written lines in Turkish. All the surrounding debate popularized the line to the point that, according to Nurullah Ataç, "it was in all the ferries, trams, coffeehouses", indeed becoming an idiomatic expression. Another line by the poet that has been at least as popular in daily language is "Bir de rakı şişesinde balık olsam" (..one more thing, would that I were a fish in a bottle of rakı), which Orhan Veli had written specifically to satirize Ahmet Haşim's famous line "Göllerde bu dem bir kamış olsam (Would that in this moment I were a cane of reed in the lakes)".

He left PTT in 1942 for his mandatory military service. He served until 1945 in Kavakköy in Gallipoli. During this time only six poems of his were published. He was discharged in 1945 as a lieutenant and started working in the Translations Department of the Ministry of Education. His translations from French were published in the Classics series of the Ministry. He published a volume of poetry titled "Vazgeçemediğim" in February 1945, and a second edition of Garip containing only his poetry in April. These were followed by "Destan Gibi" in 1946 and "Yenisi" in 1947.

With the departure of Hasan Âli Yücel as the minister of education following the 1946 elections, the Translations Office he had founded lost its prominence in the ministry. Kanık resigned shortly after. In later years he would point to the discomfort of the oppressive atmosphere that had taken over the ministry with the incoming minister Reşat Şemsettin Sirer as the reason for his resignation. He started writing essays and reviews in the newspapers "Hür" and "Zincirli Hürriyet" published by Mehmet Ali Aybar. In 1948 he translated La Fontaine's tales into Turkish and published his "Yolcu Notları" in the "Ulus" newspaper.

Gatherings with friends such as Bedri Rahmi Eyüboğlu, Abidin Dino, Necati Cumalı, Sabahattin Eyüboğlu, Oktay Rıfat and Melih Cevdet, who had all found themselves in a similar situation after the changes in the Ministry of Education, led to the idea of bringing out a new magazine together at the end of 1948. Financially supported by Mahmut Dikerdem the literary magazine Yaprak was a biweekly. Orhan Veli was the publisher and the editor in chief, which got him deeply involved with the financial health of the publication, at one point even causing him to sell his coat to cover costs. He had had to sell the paintings given to him as gifts by Abidin Dino to pay for bringing out the very last issue. Yaprak's first issue came out on 1 January 1949, and it was continued for 28 issues in total until June 1950, bringing to public works by many writers and poets including Cahit Sıtkı Tarancı, Sait Faik Abasıyanık, Fazıl Hüsnü Dağlarca, Cahit Külebi. In Yaprak Orhan Veli's intellectual and opinion leader aspects besides his position as a poet also came to light. He opinionated on the upcoming elections in the magazine. Socially conscious poetry by Oktay Rıfat and Melih Cevdet were published. In the same time period Orhan Veli, Oktay Rıfat and Melih Cevdet campaigned for Nazım Hikmet's release from prison, holding a three-day hunger strike. During 1949 Orhan Veli adapted Nasreddin Hoca tales into verse, published his last volume of poetry "Karşı" and co-translated Charles Lamb adaptations of Shakespeare's "Hamlet" and "the Merchant of Venice" into Turkish with Şehbal Erdeniz.

Death 
After Yaprak was shuttered Kanık moved back to Istanbul. He was visiting Ankara for a couple of weeks when on 10 November 1950 he fell down a hole in the street dug by the municipality works, hurt seemingly lightly. He returned to Istanbul two days later. On 14 November he felt sick while having lunch at a friend's house and was admitted to hospital. He was misdiagnosed and treated for alcohol poisoning, slipping into a coma at 20:00 the same evening. He died of a brain aneurysm at 23:30 in Cerrahpaşa Hospital, Istanbul.

For the 38th anniversary of his death a sculpture of him was inaugurated in Aşiyan Asri Cemetery where he is buried. In 1998 two more sculptures were made featuring him, this time in Vişnezade. He is featured in Gürdal Duyars Şairler Sofası which was erected in a park of the same name. The sculpture features him in a composition that also includes 6 other famous Turkish poets. In the same park Namık Denizhans sculpture of Orhan Veli was also erected.

Works 
Garip (Together with Oktay Rifat and Melih Cevdet, 1941)
Garip  (1945)
Vazgeçemediğim (1945)
Destan Gibi (1946)
Yenisi (1947)
Karşı (1949)
Collected Poems (1951, 1975)

Translations 
Güneş/Sol, Leonardo da Fonseca (trad.),  (n.t.) Revista Literária em Tradução, nº 2 (mar/2011), Fpolis/Brasil, ISSN 2177-5141

References

Translation from the corresponding article in the Turkish Wikipedia

External links

 Just for the Hell of It — a website with many of Orhan Veli's poems, as translated by Talat Sait Halman
 Poems By Orhan Veli — a website with Orhan Veli's poems, as translated by Murat Nemet Nejat
 Official Web Site — official web site of Orhan Veli Kanık

1914 births
1950 deaths
People from Beykoz
Darülfünun alumni
Turkish poets
Turkish satirists
Burials at Aşiyan Asri Cemetery
20th-century poets
Deaths from intracranial aneurysm